USPA may refer to:

 United States Parachute Association
 United States Polo Association
 United States Permafrost Association, a geoscience organization
 United Services Planning Association, a former name of First Command Financial Planning
 USpA, undifferentiated spondyloarthropathy
 UspA, a type of universal stress protein